Geoffrey Ford may refer to:
 Geoffrey Ford (businessman), British businessman
 Geoffrey Ford (cricketer) (born 1961), former English cricketer